St. John's Lutheran Church may refer to:

United States 
(by state, then city/town)
 St. John's Lutheran Church (Orange, California), listed on the National Register of Historic Places (NRHP) in Orange County
 St. John's Lutheran Church (Atlanta, Georgia),  Sam Venable's home before being bought and converted into a church in 1959
 St. John's Lutheran Church (Wheaton, Illinois)
 St. John's Lutheran Church and School, Dillsboro, Indiana, listed on the NRHP in Dearborn County
 St. John's Lutheran Church (Ellettsville, Indiana)
 St. John's Lutheran Church (Goshen, Indiana), listed on the NRHP in Elkhart County
 St. John's Lutheran Church (Hampton, Iowa), listed on the NRHP in Franklin County
 St. John's Lutheran Church (Kalona, Iowa), listed on the NRHP in Johnson County
 St. John's Lutheran Church (Hagerstown, Maryland)
 St. John's Lutheran Church (Parkville, Maryland)
 Saint John's Lutheran Church (Adrian, Michigan), listed on the NRHP in Lenawee County
 St. John's Lutheran Church (Port Hope, Michigan), listed on the NRHP in Huron County
 St. John's Lutheran Church (Isanti, Minnesota), listed on the NRHP in Isanti County
 St. John's Lutheran Church (Northfield, Minnesota)
 St. John's Evangelical Lutheran Church (Corning, Missouri)
 St. John Lutheran Church (Ellisville, Missouri), (Missouri's second largest church according to membership)
 St. John's Lutheran Church Complex, Auburn, Nebraska, listed on the NRHP in Nemaha County
 St. John's Lutheran Church (Ancram, New York)
 St. John's Lutheran Church (Beekman Corners, New York), listed on the NRHP in Schoharie County
 St. John's Lutheran Church (Conover, North Carolina)
 St. John's Lutheran Church (Salisbury, North Carolina)
 South Wild Rice Church, near Galchutt, North Dakota, also known as St. John's Lutheran Church, listed on the NRHP in Richland County
 St. John's Lutheran Church (Dublin, Ohio), listed on the NRHP in Franklin County
 St. John's Lutheran Church (Petersburg, Ohio)
 St. John's Evangelical Lutheran Church (Stovertown, Ohio), listed on the NRHP in Muskingum County
 St. John's Lutheran Church (Zanesville, Ohio), listed on the NRHP in Muskingum County
 St John's Evangelical Lutheran Church (Erie, Pennsylvania)
 St. John's Lutheran Church (Pomaria, South Carolina), listed on the NRHP in Newberry County
 St. John's Lutheran Church (Walhalla, South Carolina), listed on the NRHP in Oconee County
 St. John's Lutheran Church (Knoxville, Tennessee), listed on the NRHP in Knox County
 St. John's Evangelical Lutheran Church (Wharton, Texas), listed on the NRHP in Wharton County
 St. John's Lutheran Church and Cemetery, Wytheville, Virginia, listed on the NRHP in Wythe County
 St. John's Lutheran Church (Spokane, Washington)
 St. John's Lutheran Church (Brookfield, Wisconsin)
 St. John's Lutheran Church (Evansville, Wisconsin), listed on the NRHP in Rock County

See also
St. John's Evangelical Lutheran Church (disambiguation)